Louis L. Williams, Jr., was the director of the Malaria Control in War Areas from 1942 to 1943.

References

Directors of the Centers for Disease Control and Prevention
Franklin D. Roosevelt administration personnel